Bajan may refer to:

Geography and culture

Barbados 

 Barbadians, known by the colloquialism Bajan(s) (pronounced 'bay-jun')
 Barbadian English language
 Bajan Creole, a Creole language

Other location 

 Something or someone from Baja California peninsula, Mexico

Other 
 Bajan (surname)
 "Bajan", a song by Argentine band Pescado Rabioso member Luis Alberto Spinetta, from the album Artaud

See also 
 Barbadian (disambiguation)
 Bayan (disambiguation)
 Bayjan (disambiguation)
 Bhajan, an Indian devotional song
 

Language and nationality disambiguation pages